The 2015 CONCACAF Men's Olympic Qualifying Championship was an international football tournament that was held in the United States from 1 and 13 October 2015. The eight national teams involved in the tournament were required to register a squad of twenty players, three of whom had to be goalkeepers.

The final lists were published by CONCACAF on 25 September 2015.

All registered players had to have been born on or after 1 January 1993 (Regulations Article 13). The age listed for each player is on 1 October 2015, the first day of the tournament. A flag is included for coaches who are of a different nationality than their own national team. Players marked in bold have been capped at full international level.

Group A

Canada
Head coach:  Benito Floro

Cuba
Head coach:  Raul Gonzalez Triana

The following players defected during the tournament:

Notes

Panama
Head coach:  Leonardo Pipino

United States
Head coach:  Andi Herzog

Group B

Costa Rica
Head coach: Luis Fernando Fallas

Haiti
Head coach:  Marc Collat

Honduras
Marcelo Pereira was replaced with Emerson Lalin prior to the tournament beginning, Brayan García was replaced Elder Torres with  prior to the tournament beginning, Bryan Róchez was replaced with Allan Benegas prior to the tournament beginning

Mexico
Head coach:  Raul Gutierrez

References 

Squads